The Scotties Tournament of Hearts (commonly referred to as the Scotties) is the annual Canadian women's curling championship, sanctioned by Curling Canada, formerly called the Canadian Curling Association. The winner goes on to represent Canada at the women's world curling championships. Since 1985, the winner also gets to return to the following year's tournament as "Team Canada". It is formally known as the "Canadian Women's Curling Championship".

Since 1982, the tournament has been sponsored by Kruger Products, which was formerly known as Scott Paper Limited when it was a Canadian subsidiary of Scott Paper Company. As such, the tournament was formerly known as the Scott Tournament of Hearts; when Kimberly-Clark merged with Scott, the Canadian arm was sold to the Quebec-based Kruger Inc. – while Kruger was granted a license to use several Scott brands in Canada until June 2007, it was given a long-term license to the Scotties brand because Kimberly-Clark already owned Kleenex. As such, the tournament was officially renamed the Scotties Tournament of Hearts in 2007.

Until 2018, the format was a round robin of 12 teams. Starting with the 2015 Scotties Tournament of Hearts there have been more than twelve eligible teams; therefore a pre-qualification tournament was held to trim the field to twelve. In 2021, a new 18-team format was introduced, in which all 14 member associations of Curling Canada field a team in a main draw of two pools, alongside the defending champions, and the three highest-ranked teams on the Canadian Team Ranking System standings that did not win their provincial championships. The teams are separated into two pools of nine, each playing a round-robin within their pool, with the top three teams in each pool advancing to a second round to determine the final four teams.

At the end of the second round, playoffs occur to determine the championship winner. The system used is known as the Page playoff system.

History

Pre-history
1913 marked a significant point in women's curling when both the Manitoba Bonspiel and the Ontario Curling Association began holding women's curling events. Other provinces would later add provincial women's championships, but it wasn't until the 1950s that a higher level of women's curling began to occur. At this time there was a Western Canada Women's Championship (sponsored by the T. Eaton Company) but no tournament existed for the eastern provinces. By 1959, Eaton's pulled their sponsorship, giving the organizers of the Western championships an initiative to have a national championship.

In 1960, the Canadian Ladies' Curling Association was created with Dominion Stores Ltd. seeking to sponsor a national championship. That year, an eastern championship occurred so that the winner could play the winner of the western championship in an invitational event. In this event, Ruth Smith and her team from Lacolle, Quebec faced off against Joyce McKee's team from Saskatchewan (consisting of Sylvia Fedoruk, Donna Belding and Muriel Coben) with McKee winning the best-of-three series two games to none. The games between the two teams were played in Oshawa, Ontario.  

The following year a tournament was organized with the same format as the Brier and was held in Ottawa. McKee won again, with a new front end of Barbara MacNevin and Rosa McFee.

Early history
In 1967, Dominion Stores were unable to reach a compromise with the organizers of the tournament, and their sponsorship fell. The Canadian Ladies' Curling Association ran the tournament by themselves with no main sponsor.

Sylvia Fedoruk, after assuming the presidency of the Canadian Ladies' Curling Association found a title sponsor in the Macdonald Tobacco Company, the same sponsor as the Brier. Their sponsorship began in 1972 with the tournament being called the "Macdonald Lassie" championship, after the company's trademark.

In 1979, under increasing pressure from the anti-tobacco policies of the Canadian Government, the Macdonald Tobacco Company pulled their sponsorship from both the Brier and the Women's championship. The Canadian Ladies' Curling Association ran the tournament without a main sponsor again for the next couple of years. 1979 also marked the first year of the Women's World Curling Championship, where the national champion would play. Also, the 1979 event was the first tournament to feature a playoff. Before then, the championship team was the one with the best round robin record.

Tournament of Hearts
Robin Wilson, a member of the 1979 championship team, and a former employee of Scott Paper led an effort to get the company to sponsor the championships. It was successful, and in 1982 the first Scott Tournament of Hearts was held.

The Scott Tournament of Hearts would last 25 years, and saw the likes of many great teams. The first Tournament of Hearts was won by Colleen Jones and her Nova Scotia team. It would take her 17 years to win another, but she would cap it off with another four championships for a grand total of six championships. In 2018, Colleen Jones' feat of six championships was equaled by Manitoba's Jennifer Jones. Other great curlers at the Hearts have been Kerri Einarson and Connie Laliberte of Manitoba, Heather Houston, Marilyn Bodogh and Rachel Homan of Ontario, Vera Pezer and Sandra Schmirler of Saskatchewan, Cathy Borst, Shannon Kleibrink and Chelsea Carey of Alberta and Lindsay Sparkes and Kelly Scott of British Columbia.

The new sponsorship made the tournament popular when it began to be televised. Today, TSN covers the entire tournament. CBC had covered the semi-finals and the finals up until the 2007–08 season. In 2013, Sportsnet and City began to offer coverage of the finals of the provincial playdowns in Manitoba, Ontario, and Alberta as well.

As a Tournament of Hearts tradition, the members of the winning team receive gold rings in the four-heart design of the Tournament of Hearts logo, set with a .25-carat diamond. The runners-up receive the same rings, with rubies instead of diamonds, and the third-place team receives gold rings set with emeralds.

Past champions

Diamond D Championship

Canadian Ladies Curling Association Championship

Macdonald Lassies Championship

Canadian Ladies Curling Association Championship

Scott Tournament of Hearts

Scotties Tournament of Hearts

Top 3 finishes table
As of the 2023 Scotties Tournament of Hearts

Note. When Team Canada wins are added to provincial tallies, Manitoba has 16 gold medals, Saskatchewan has 12, British Columbia has 10, Ontario has 8, and Nova Scotia has 7. All others would remain unadjusted.

Award winners

Sandra Schmirler Most Valuable Player Award
The Sandra Schmirler Most Valuable Player Award is awarded by the media to the most valuable player during the playoffs at the Scotties Tournament of Hearts.  The 2023 winner was Kerri Einarson of Team Canada.

Shot of the Week Award
The Shot of the Week Award is presented by the organizing committee to the player who makes the most outstanding shot during the tournament.  The award has not been presented since 2013.

Marj Mitchell Sportsmanship Award
The Marj Mitchell Sportsmanship Award is awarded annually to the most sportsmanlike curler at the Tournament of Hearts every year.  The award has been presented since 1982, and has been named in Mitchell's honour since 1998.  In 2023, the Marj Mitchell Sportsmanship Award was presented to Kerry Galusha of the Northwest Territories.

Joan Mead Builder Award
The Joan Mead Builder Award, named after CBC producer Joan Mead, goes to someone in the curling community that significantly contributes to the growth and development of women's curling in Canada. It has been awarded annually since 2001.

Winners

2001: Lloyd Stansell
2002: Warren Hansen
2003: Vic Rauter
2004: Vera Pezer
2005: Shirley Morash
2006: Robin Wilson
2007: Muriel Fage
2008: Don Wittman
2009: Linda Bolton
2010: Anne Merklinger
2011: Elaine Dagg-Jackson, Canadian Curling Association National Team Coach
2012: Cheryl Bernard, four-time Scotties Tournament of Hearts participant, Olympic silver medalist
2013: Andrew Klaver, Scotties Tournament of Hearts photographer
2014: Linda Moore
2015: Bernadette McIntyre
2016: Renée Sonnenberg
2017: Wendy Morgan, both Program Manager and national team leader of Curling Canada's wheelchair curling program
2018: Melissa Soligo
2019: Leslie Ann Walsh
2020: Deanna Rindal, umpire at provincial and national curling tournaments
2021: Shannon Kleibrink, five-time Scotties Tournament of Hearts participant, Olympic bronze medalist
2022: Leslie Kerr, inaugural Executive Director of the Northern Ontario Curling Association from 2007 to 2020, after guiding the amalgamation of 5 regional curling associations into the NOCA.
2023: Dianne Barker, umpire at provincial, national, World, and three Olympic curling tournaments, board member of Curl BC and Curling Canada

All-Star teams
2023
First Team
Skip: Kerri Einarson, Team Canada
Third: Val Sweeting, Team Canada
Second: Shannon Birchard, Team Canada
Lead: Sarah Potts, Northern Ontario

Second Team
Skip: Rachel Homan, Ontario
Third: Laura Walker, Wild Card 1
Second: Emma Miskew, Ontario
Lead: Briane Harris, Team Canada

2022
First Team
Skip: Kerri Einarson, Team Canada
Third: Val Sweeting, Team Canada
Second: Shannon Birchard, Team Canada
Lead: Briane Meilleur, Team Canada

Second Team
Skip: Selena Njegovan, Wild Card 1
Third: Sarah Wilkes, Wild Card 3
Second: Ashley Sippala, Northern Ontario
Lead: Kerry Galusha, Northwest Territories 

2021
First Team
Skip: Kerri Einarson, Team Canada
Third: Val Sweeting, Team Canada
Second: Shannon Birchard, Team Canada
Lead: Lisa Weagle, Manitoba

Second Team
Skip: Rachel Homan, Ontario
Third: Selena Njegovan, Wild Card 1
Second: Jocelyn Peterman, Manitoba
Lead: Joanne Courtney, Ontario

2020
First Team
Skip: Rachel Homan, Ontario
Third: Val Sweeting, Manitoba
Second: Shannon Birchard, Manitoba
Lead: Lisa Weagle, Ontario

Second Team
Skip: Kerri Einarson, Manitoba
Third: Emma Miskew, Ontario
Second: Joanne Courtney, Ontario
Lead: Rachelle Brown, Team Canada

2019
First Team
Skip: Rachel Homan, Ontario
Third: Emma Miskew, Ontario
Second: Jen Gates, Northern Ontario
Lead: Dawn McEwen, Team Canada

Second Team
Skip: Krista McCarville, Northern Ontario
Third: Kendra Lilly, Northern Ontario
Second: Joanne Courtney, Ontario
Lead: Sarah Potts, Northern Ontario

2018
First Team
Skip: Jennifer Jones, Manitoba
Third: Cary-Anne McTaggart, Alberta
Second: Jill Officer, Manitoba
Lead: Dawn McEwen, Manitoba

Second Team
Skip: Tracy Fleury, Northern Ontario
Third: Shannon Birchard, Manitoba
Second: Jessie Scheidegger, Alberta
Lead: Raunora Westcott, Team Canada

2017
First Team
Skip: Rachel Homan, Ontario
Third: Emma Miskew, Ontario
Second: Joanne Courtney, Ontario
Lead: Blaine de Jager, British Columbia

Second Team
Skip: Chelsea Carey, Team Canada
Third: Shannon Aleksic, British Columbia
Second: Sarah Wilkes, Alberta
Lead: Lisa Weagle, Ontario

2016
First Team
Skip: Jennifer Jones, Team Canada
Third: Kaitlyn Lawes, Team Canada
Second: Jill Officer, Team Canada
Lead: Dawn McEwen, Team Canada

Second Team
Skip: Chelsea Carey, Alberta
Third: Ashley Howard, Saskatchewan
Second: Liz Fyfe, Manitoba
Lead: Sarah Potts, Northern Ontario

2015
First Team
Skip: Stefanie Lawton, Saskatchewan
Third: Kaitlyn Lawes, Manitoba
Second: Jill Officer, Manitoba
Lead: Dawn McEwen, Manitoba

Second Team
Skip: Jennifer Jones, Manitoba
Third: Lori Olson-Johns, Alberta
Second: Stephanie Schmidt, Saskatchewan
Lead: Lisa Weagle, Team Canada

2014
First Team
Skip: Rachel Homan, Team Canada
Third: Emma Miskew, Team Canada
Second: Alison Kreviazuk, Team Canada
Lead: Teri Lake, Nova Scotia

Second Team
Skip: Chelsea Carey, Manitoba
Third: Sherry Anderson, Saskatchewan
Second: Sherri Singler, Saskatchewan
Lead: Morgan Court, Ontario

2013
First Team
Skip: Jennifer Jones, Manitoba
Third: Kaitlyn Lawes, Manitoba
Second: Alison Kreviazuk, Ontario
Lead: Dawn Askin, Manitoba

Second Team
Skip: Rachel Homan, Ontario
Third: Jeanna Schraeder, British Columbia
Second: Jill Officer, Manitoba
Lead: Laine Peters, Canada

2012
First Team
Skip: Jennifer Jones, Manitoba
Third: Kaitlyn Lawes, Manitoba
Second: Jill Officer, Manitoba
Lead: Dawn Askin, Manitoba

Second Team
 Skip: Kelly Scott, British Columbia
 Third: Beth Iskiw, Alberta
 Second: Jessica Mair, Alberta
 Lead: Laine Peters, Alberta

2011
First Team
Skip: Jennifer Jones, Team Canada
Third: Kaitlyn Lawes, Team Canada
Second: Jill Officer, Team Canada
Lead: Dawn Askin, Team Canada

Second Team
Skip: Amber Holland, Saskatchewan
Third: Kim Schneider, Saskatchewan
Second: Tammy Schneider, Saskatchewan
Lead: Chelsey Bell, Alberta

2010
First Team
Skip: Kelly Scott, British Columbia
Third: Cathy Overton-Clapham, Team Canada
Second: Jill Officer, Team Canada
Lead: Dawn Askin, Team Canada

Second Team
Skip: Jennifer Jones, Team Canada
Third: Jeanna Schraeder, British Columbia
Second: Sasha Carter, British Columbia
Lead: Jacquie Armstrong, British Columbia

2009
First Team
Skip: Stefanie Lawton, Saskatchewan
Third: Cathy Overton-Clapham, Team Canada
Second: Diane Gushulak, British Columbia
Lead: Lana Vey, Saskatchewan

Second Team
Skip: Marla Mallett, British Columbia
Third: Grace MacInnes, British Columbia
Second: Sherri Singler, Saskatchewan
Lead: Joëlle Sabourin, Quebec

2008
First Team
Skip: Shannon Kleibrink, Alberta
Third: Amy Nixon, Alberta
Second: Jill Officer, Manitoba
Lead: Chelsey Bell, Alberta

Second Team
Skip: Sherry Middaugh, Ontario
Third: Cathy Overton-Clapham, Manitoba
Second: Sasha Carter, Team Canada
Lead: Dawn Askin, Manitoba

2007
First Team
Skip: Kelly Scott, Team Canada
Third: Jeanna Schraeder, Team Canada
Second: Jill Officer, Manitoba
Lead: Marcia Gudereit, Saskatchewan

Second Team
Skip: Jan Betker, Saskatchewan
Third: Lana Vey, Saskatchewan
Second: Sasha Carter, Team Canada
Lead: Darah Provencal, British Columbia

2006
First Team
Skip: Kelly Scott, British Columbia
Third: Jeanna Schraeder, British Columbia
Second: Mary-Anne Arsenault, Nova Scotia
Lead: Georgina Wheatcroft, Team Canada

Second Team
Skip: Heather Strong, Newfoundland and Labrador
Third: Cathy Overton-Clapham, Team Canada
Second: Sasha Carter, British Columbia
Lead: Nancy Delahunt, Nova Scotia

2005
First Team
Skip: Jennifer Jones, Manitoba
Third: Marliese Miller, Saskatchewan
Second: Dawn Askin, Ontario
Lead: Nancy Delahunt, Team Canada

Second Team
Skip: Jenn Hanna, Ontario
Third: Pascale Letendre, Ontario
Second: Sherri Singler, Saskatchewan
Lead: Susan O'Leary, Newfoundland and Labrador

2004
First Team
Skip: Colleen Jones, Team Canada
Third: Amy Nixon, Alberta
Second: Maureen Bonar, Manitoba
Lead: Nancy Delahunt, Team Canada

Second Team
Skip: Lois Fowler, Manitoba
Third: Kim Kelly, Team Canada
Second: Mary-Anne Arsenault, Team Canada
Lead: Heather Martin, Newfoundland and Labrador

2003
First Team
Skip: Colleen Jones, Team Canada
Third: Sherry Linton, Saskatchewan
Second: Robyn MacPhee, Prince Edward Island
Lead: Nancy Delahunt, Team Canada

Second Team
Skip: Suzanne Gaudet, Prince Edward Island
Third: Rebecca Jean MacPhee, Prince Edward Island
Second: Joan McCusker, Saskatchewan
Lead: Kate Horne, Alberta

2002
First Team
Skip: Sherry Anderson, Saskatchewan
Third: Janet Brown, Ontario
Second: Mary-Anne Waye, Team Canada
Lead: Nancy Delahunt, Team Canada

Second Team
Skip: Sherry Middaugh, Ontario
Third: Lawnie MacDonald, Alberta
Second: Lynn Fallis-Kurz, Manitoba
Lead: Allison Franey, New Brunswick

2001
First Team
Skip: Marie-France Larouche, Quebec
Third: Kim Kelly, Nova Scotia
Second: Georgina Wheatcroft, Team Canada
Lead: Sheri Cordina, Ontario

Second Team
Skip: Kelley Law, Team Canada
Third: Lisa Whitaker, British Columbia
Second: Roberta Materi, Saskatchewan
Lead: Karen McNamee, Alberta

2000
First Team
Skip: Connie Laliberte, Manitoba
Third: Cathy Overton-Clapham, Manitoba
Second: Karen Daku, Saskatchewan
Lead: Tricia MacGregor, Prince Edward Island

Second Team
Skip: Anne Merklinger, Ontario
Third: Cathy Walter, Saskatchewan
Second: Debbie Jones-Walker, Manitoba
Lead: Nancy Delahunt, Team Canada

1999
First Team
Skip: Colleen Jones, Nova Scotia
Third: Heather Godberson, Team Canada
Second: Brenda Bohmer, Team Canada
Lead: Lou Ann Henry, Prince Edward Island

Second Team
Skip: Connie Laliberte, Manitoba
Third: Marcy Balderston, Alberta
Second: Mary-Anne Waye, Nova Scotia
Lead: Kate Horne, Team Canada

1998
First Team
Skip: Cathy Borst, Alberta
Third: Jan Betker, Team Canada
Second: Brenda Bohmer, Alberta
Lead: Marcia Gudereit, Team Canada

Second Team
Skip: Anne Merklinger, Ontario
Third: Heather Godberson, Alberta
Second: Patti McKnight, Ontario
Lead: Heather Hopkins, Nova Scotia

1997
First Team
Skip: Sandra Schmirler, Saskatchewan
Third: Jan Betker, Saskatchewan
Second: Joan McCusker, Saskatchewan
Lead: Jane Hooper, Team Canada

Second Team
Skip: Alison Goring, Ontario
Third: Heather Godberson, Alberta
Second: Corie Beveridge, Team Canada
Lead: Heather Martin, Newfoundland

1996
Skip: Sherry Scheirich, Saskatchewan
Third: Kim Gellard, Ontario
Second: Tricia MacGregor, Prince Edward Island
Lead: Judy Pendergast, Alberta

1995
Skip: Rebecca MacPhee, Prince Edward Island
Third: Kay Montgomery, Saskatchewan
Second: Joan McCusker, Team Canada
Lead: Janet Arnott, Manitoba

1994
Skip: Laura Phillips, Newfoundland
Third: Jan Betker, Team Canada
Second: Joan McCusker, Team Canada
Lead: Kim Kelly, Nova Scotia

1993
Skip: Sandra Peterson, Saskatchewan
Third: Cathy Cunningham, Newfoundland
Second: Patti McKnight, Ontario
Lead: Mary-Anne Waye, Nova Scotia

1992
Skip: Lisa Walker, British Columbia
Third: Kathy Fahlman, Saskatchewan
Second: Kim Kelly, Nova Scotia
Lead: Karri Willms, Team Canada

1991
Skip: Julie Sutton, British Columbia
Third: Jackie-Rae Greening, Alberta
Second: Sheri Stewart, New Brunswick
Lead: Cheryl McPherson, Team Canada

1990
Skip: Heather Rankin, Nova Scotia
Third: Jackie-Rae Greening, Alberta
Second: Andrea Lawes, Ontario
Lead: Lorie Kehler, Saskatchewan

1989
Skip: Chris More, Manitoba
Third: Karen Purdy, Manitoba
Second: Diane Alexander, Alberta
Lead: Tracy Kennedy, Team Canada

1988
Skip: Michelle Schneider, Saskatchewan
Third: Cindy Tucker, British Columbia
Second: Georgina Hawkes, British Columbia
Lead: Tracy Kennedy, Ontario

1987
Skip: Kathie Ellwood, Manitoba
Third: Sandra Schmirler, Saskatchewan
Second: Jan Betker, Saskatchewan
Lead: Sheila Schneider, Saskatchewan

1986
Skip: Linda Moore, Team Canada
Third: Kathy McEdwards, Ontario
Second: Chris Gervais, Saskatchewan
Lead: Laurie Carney, Team Canada

1985
Skip: Susan Seitz, Alberta
Third: Lindsay Sparkes, British Columbia
Second: Debbie Jones, British Columbia
Lead: Debbie Herbert, Newfoundland

1984
Skip: Connie Laliberte, Manitoba
Third: Gillian Thompson, Saskatchewan
Second: Chris Gervais, Saskatchewan
Lead: Laurie Carney, British Columbia

1983
Skip: Shelly Bildfell, Yukon/Northwest Territories
Third: Sharon Horne, Nova Scotia
Second: Cathy Caudle, Nova Scotia
Lead: Penny Ryan, Alberta

1982
Skip: Arleen Day, Saskatchewan
Third: Lynne Andrews, Manitoba
Second: Donna Cunliffe, British Columbia
Lead: Barbara Jones-Gordon, Nova Scotia

Ford Hot Shots

Records

Number of games played
As of the 2023 Scotties; excluding pre-qualifying and wild card games

Perfect games
A perfect game in curling is one in which a player scores 100% on all their shots in a game. Statistics on shots have been kept since 1982.

See also
Tim Hortons Brier (men's)
Columba Cream Scottish Women's Championship
United States Curling Women's Championships

References

External links and sources

Results Archive
Curlingzone.com

 
Women's curling competitions in Canada
Annual sporting events in Canada
Recurring sporting events established in 1961
1961 establishments in Canada